Floogals is a British live-action/animated television series aimed at preschoolers, produced by Nevision Studios, Jellyfish Pictures and Zodiak Kids, with concepts from Absolutely Cuckoo. Sprout (now Universal Kids), a children's TV channel in the United States which commissioned the series, also participated in the production. The series was developed by Ceri Barnes, Lee Walters, Nigel Pickard and Rick Gitelson, from an original idea by Dan Good (who created Waybuloo). Production took place in London during 2014 and 2015 with all CGI animation by Jellyfish Pictures. The series was first broadcast in the United States as a 'Sprout original series', and series 2 and 3 have been subsequently commissioned.

In September 2019, it was confirmed series three will be the final series and production has ended.

Synopsis and overview
The show centers on three four-inch tall extraterrestrials called Floogals who have come to Earth to study its inhabitants. Upon landing, a human boy, thinking their spaceship is a toy, hangs their craft onto the ceiling of his bedroom. The Floogals, however, don't seem to mind as they carry on with their studying.

While the show is set in a real Earthly place featuring live-action humans, the Floogals are CGI.

During each episode, the Floogals come across an object on Earth of which they try to gain knowledge. Once their study is done, they pass their research to the base on their home planet. After the report is sent, if it is liked, the floogals receive a sticker each featuring the object they have just researched.

Characters

Floogals
The three protagonists consist of two male lavender colored and one female pink colored extraterrestrials in space suits and headgears. While they lack noses, they each have four trumpet-shaped protrusions on their heads which are used for both hearing and smelling.
Fleeker, the Captain; He wears  a red suit, addresses self "Captain Fleeker." Voiced by Rasmus Hardiker.
Boomer, a space adventurer trainee. He wears a green suit, addresses self "Junior Floogal Boomer." Voiced by Hugo Harold-Harrison in Series 1 and 2, Dan Wright in Series 3.
Flo, the First Officer. She wears a yellow suit, addresses self "First Officer Flo Floogal", her four Floogal Horns are at the top half of her head, instead of two on top and two on bottom, like the male Floogals. Voiced by Jules de Jongh in series 1 and 2, Angela Griffin in series 3.
Fee, the Roaming Reporter. She wears a light blue suit, with a little robot buddy named Doodle. Her Floogal Horns are just like Flo's. Voiced by [put voice actor's name here]. She's been seen in only a couple episodes, so she's a character not really known.

Hoomans
The human family whose house is where the Floogals are stationed at. Their faces are kept secretly hidden from the picture.
Dad aka "Dad Hooman", his name is Michael as mentioned in the episode, "Project:Washer/Dryer". He is voiced by Chris Corcoran.
Evie aka "Girl Hooman" She is five years old, as heard in "Project:Balloon." 
Luke ("Lukie") King aka "Boy Hooman" He is eight years old, as heard and shown in "Project: Birthday Cake."
Mom aka "Mom Hooman", her name is Gaby as mentioned in "Project Power Outage", and her surname is mentioned in "Project Halloween" when a kid compliments her on her Jack-o-Lantern, calling her Mrs. King
Aunt Samantha, Evie & Luke's aunt in "Project Baby".
Hugo, Evie & Luke's baby cousin in "Project Baby".
The Gundersons, neighbors of the Kings, mentioned in “Project Mole”.

Animals
Scruffy the Dog.
Toby the Tortoise.
Bella the Cat
Theo the Rabbit
Edwin the Caterpillar

Episodes
There are 52 episodes each 11 minutes.

 Welcome To Earth (pilot)
 Project Ice
 Project Tortoise
 Project Balloon
 Project Trumpet
 Project Flashlight
 Project Baby
 Project Leash
 Project Puzzle
 Project Bubbles
 Project Halloween
 Project Mirror
 Project Banana
 Project Sleepover
 Project Clock
 Project Helicopter
 Project Toothbrush
 Project Washer Dryer
 Project Glue
 Project Rubberbands
 Project Sand
 Project Boxes
 Project Egg Hunt
 Project Caterpillar
 Project Clay
 Project Garden Hose
 Project Piano
 Project Tent
 Project Popcorn
 Project Dusting
 Project Seeds
 Project Rollerskates
 Project Picnic
 Project Rabbit
 Project Painting
 Project Singing
 Project Record Player
 Project Table Tennis
 Project Robot
 Project Birthday Cake
 Project Mail
 Project Magnet
 Project Ring
 Project Umbrella
 Project Bandages
 Project Vacuum
 Project Jewelry Box
 Project Vacation
 Project Aluminum Foil
 Project Hamster
 Project Pencil
 Project Rainbow
 Project Kite

Shorts
Floogals Discover Ice
Floogals Welcome to Earth (Pilot)
Floogals - Banana
Floogals - Turtle
Today's Project - Washer Dryer
Floogal Your World
Blooper Reel

Broadcast

The series premiered in the United States on January 23, 2016 on what was known as Sprout, a specialty television channel owned by Comcast's NBCUniversal. Upon the channel's relaunch as Universal Kids on 9 September 2017, the Sprout brand was used as a name of the programming block for preschoolers until 26 January 2018, when the block was renamed Universal Kids preschool. The series was also shown on NBC's NBC Kids television block until the block's cancellation in September 2016.

In Canada, the series was broadcast on TVOntario's TVOKids block, and Knowledge Network.

In the United Kingdom, the Scottish Gaelic version was broadcast on BBC Alba, and the English version later premiered on Channel 5's Milkshake! block in July 2017.

In Australia, the series was broadcast on ABC2's ABC Kids block.

In Ireland, the series was broadcast on RTÉ and 3Kids.

In South Africa, the series was broadcast on eToonz.

In Arab countries, the series was broadcast on MBC 3.

In German, the series was broadcast on Super RTL.

In France, the series was broadcast on Piwi+.

References

External links
 Floogals at Sprout
 Floogals at Nevision
 Floogals at Jellyfish Pictures
 

2010s British animated television series
2020s British animated television series
2016 British television series debuts
2020 British television series endings
British children's animated space adventure television series
British children's animated science fantasy television series
British preschool education television series
British television series with live action and animation
NBC original programming
Television series by Banijay
Animated television series about extraterrestrial life
Animated preschool education television series
2010s preschool education television series
Universal Kids original programming
English-language television shows